Alice Sant'Anna (born May 24, 1988 in Rio de Janeiro) is a Brazilian poet, best known for her poetry books Dobradura (2007), Pingue-pongue (2012), Rabo de baleia (2013), and Pé do ouvido (2016). She was awarded the Associação Paulista de Críticos de Arte award in 2013.

References 

1988 births
Living people
Brazilian poets
Writers from Rio de Janeiro (city)